The 1992 All-Ireland Senior Camogie Championship Final was the 61st All-Ireland Final and the deciding match of the 1992 All-Ireland Senior Camogie Championship, an inter-county camogie tournament for the top teams in Ireland.

Wexford went into the lead with a Paula Rankin goal, but Cork led 1-6 to 1-3 at the halfway mark and won by eleven points in the end, mostly due to Colette O'Mahony's accurate shooting: she scored ten points, nine of them frees.

References

All-Ireland Senior Camogie Championship Final
All-Ireland Senior Camogie Championship Final
All-Ireland Senior Camogie Championship Final, 1992
All-Ireland Senior Camogie Championship Finals
Cork county camogie team matches
Wexford county camogie team matches